Acleris quadridentana is a species of moth of the family Tortricidae. It is found in China.

The wingspan is about 20 mm. The forewings are reddish green. The hindwings are brownish grey.

References

quadridentana
Moths of Asia
Moths described in 1900